The 2011–12 Aston Villa F.C. season was Aston Villa's 137th professional season; their 101st season in the top-flight; and their 24th consecutive season in the top flight of English football, the Premier League. The club was managed by former Birmingham boss Alex McLeish, following Gérard Houllier's departure on 1 June 2011 after less than a year in charge. An extremely disappointing season for the club, saw them finish in 16th place and only two points off relegation. Numerous records were broken during the season including: the lowest points total in the Premier League (38 from 38 games), fewest wins in a season (7) and worst home record in Villa's 138-year history (19 points from 57 available). As well as poor performances in both domestic cups – being knocked out in the third round of the League Cup and the fourth round of the FA Cup – this season eventually culminated in the sacking of McLeish on 14 May 2012, a day after the season had concluded.

As Villa finished 9th in the previous season, this term was the first since 2007–08 without the club participating in European competition. There was also no Second City derby in the Premier League as local arch-rivals Birmingham City were relegated to the Football League Championship at the end of the 2010–11 season. Derbies with Villa's other West Midlands rivals West Bromwich Albion and Wolverhampton Wanderers were played in the Premier League.

During the season club captain Stiliyan Petrov was diagnosed with acute leukaemia. The news was a shock to the Villa faithful and the footballing world alike; clubs all around the world have united donning T-shirts with Petrov's name and words of support written across them. The game on 31 March 2012 against Chelsea was the first game played since the diagnosis and fans of both teams gave him a standing ovation in the 19th minute, the significance being Petrov's squad number is 19. He was at the game with his wife and two children, and you could see the emotion of the event was getting to him as he acknowledged the fans.

An under-19 Aston Villa team also took part in the inaugural season of the NextGen Series, a tournament similar to the UEFA Champions League for young European footballers to compete in. The team reached the Quarter-finals, before being knocked out by Marseille.

Kit 
Supplier: Nike / Sponsor: Genting Casinos

Kit information 
The home kit featured a subtle checkerboard print on the shirt and was very worn with black socks, last seen between mid 1920s until 1957. The away kit was unsurprisingly white with claret shorts and white socks – and has the same design as the home kit. Claret and sky blue shorts/socks were worn in several away games in order to prevent kit mix-ups. The three goalkeeper kits were blue, black and grey and was based on Nike's 2011 template which featured stunning details on the sleeves and the side of the shirt.

Players

Squad 

In the 2010–11 season the Premier League introduced new rules on squad lists. The rules included a cap on the number of players at 25; players under the age of 21 on 1 January of the year in which the season starts are exempt from the list of 25. A "home-grown rule" also requires clubs to name at least eight players in their squad of 25 players that have been registered domestically for a minimum of three seasons prior to their 21st birthday.

Players under 21 do not need to be named and can still be used.Correct as of 12 January 2012.

1

 1 Stiliyan Petrov was the club's permanent captain, but Gabriel Agbonlahor was named temporary captain while Petrov underwent treatment for acute leukemia.

Left club during season

Squad numbers 
Following the exit of Ashley Young to Manchester United, Stephen Ireland was given the #7 which was held by the former winger. With Ireland having worn the #9 shirt last season, him taking the #7 allowed Darren Bent to wear the #9 this season. Also, after Stewart Downing's departure to Liverpool, James Collins took over the #6 meaning his old #29 shirt could be given to January signing Enda Stevens.

New signings goalkeeper Shay Given and winger Charles N'Zogbia were given the #1 (vacated by the departed Brad Friedel) and #10 (vacated by the departed John Carew) shirts, respectively.

Deadline day capture Alan Hutton, took the #2 shirt left free after Luke Young's transfer to Queens Park Rangers and loan signing Jermaine Jenas had been given the #8 shirt for the season, last worn by Robert Pires. It was again vacated, however, when Jenas returned to Tottenham Hotspur in December.

Young striker Graham Burke was added to the first-team squad ahead of the League Cup tie against Bolton Wanderers on 20 September, being handed the #36 shirt.

January loan signing Robbie Keane was given the #20 shirt for his short spell at Villa, left vacated since Nigel Reo-Coker's summer departure

Youngsters Derrick Williams, Samir Carruthers and Jack Grealish were also given squad numbers (#37, #40, #41, respectively) at different points during the season, when called up for first team action.

Sponsorship 
Aston Villa had a new club sponsor for this season, after the deal with previous partner FxPro was terminated in February 2011. On 22 June 2011, Aston Villa announced via their official website that the club's new sponsor until the end of the 2012–13 season would be Malaysian-based Genting Casinos.

Managerial changes 
Manager Gérard Houllier missed the final five games of Villa's 2010–11 campaign due to health issues. He had previously faced similar problems during his time at Liverpool.

On 1 June 2011, the club confirmed that Houllier had parted ways with the club by mutual consent due to the Frenchman's ill health.

He was replaced by Scottish former Birmingham City manager Alex McLeish on 17 June 2011, despite protests from some Villa fans outside Villa Park.

Transfers

In 
Summer

Winter

Out 
Summer

Winter

Loans

In 

Summer

Winter

Out 

Summer

Winter

Fixtures and results

Pre-season

Premier League Asia Trophy

Premier League

League results summary

Matches

League table

FA Cup

League Cup

Statistics

Appearances

Goalscorers

Disciplinary record 

 
 
 

Notes

Home attendances

References 

Aston Villa
Aston Villa F.C. seasons